The 1979 Nevada Wolf Pack football team represented the University of Nevada, Reno during the 1979 NCAA Division I-AA football season. Nevada competed as a first–year member of the Big Sky Conference (BSC). The Wolf Pack were led by fourth–year head coach Chris Ault and played their home games at Mackay Stadium.

Schedule

Roster

References

Nevada
Nevada Wolf Pack football seasons
Nevada Wolf Pack football